Kajaani Castle (Finnish: Kajaanin linna, Swedish: Kajaneborg, Kajaneborgs slott, older spelling Cajanaborg) was built on the Ämmäkoski island of the Kajaani River in the centre of Kajaani, Finland, in the 17th century. Today, only roofless ruins remain of the castle.

The castle functioned as an administrative centre, prison, and military strongpoint. The most famous prisoner was the historian Johannes Messenius, who was forced to live in the poor conditions of the castle from 1616 to 1635.

Construction of Kajaani Castle began in 1604 and was completed in 1619. At first, the castle only consisted of a stone wall, two round towers, and wooden buildings in the yard inside the castle.

Count Peter Brahe ordered major additional construction of the castle in the 1650s, which was completed in 1666. During this construction, many wooden structures of the castle were replaced with stone structures to form a fortress.

During the Great Northern War (also known as the "Greater Wrath"), Russian forces besieged the castle for several months until it was finally forced to surrender because of lack of food, firewood, and ammunition. Shortly after this, the Russians blasted the castle, and its inhabitants were deported to Russia and imprisoned there.

In 1917 a hydro-electric plant was built at Ämmäkoski.

The first wooden bridge on top of the ruins was built in 1845. By 1937 the castle island became the foundation for a new road bridge made of concrete.

The bridge, called Linnansilta ("castle bridge"), was originally the only bridge across the Kajaani River. After the construction of later bridges, traffic across Linnansilta decreased, and there are plans to take down the bridge and give this national monument a due and proper restoration.

See also
 Brahe Castle
 Oulu Castle

References
 Kajaaninlinna Yhdistys
 Blog
 Castles and Fortifications in Finland
 Kajaani Castle by the Kainuu Museum
 Kajaani Castle by the City of Kajaani
 Kajaani Castle by the University of Oulu
 The National Board of Antiquities
 Geo-radar Survey:

External links
 

Castles in Finland
Castle
Ruins in Finland
Buildings and structures in Kainuu
History of Kainuu